General Henry Vane, 2nd Duke of Cleveland KG (6 August 1788 – 18 January 1864) was a British peer, politician and army officer.

Born The Honourable Henry Vane, he was the eldest son of William Vane, Viscount Barnard and his first wife, Katherine, the second daughter of Harry Powlett, 6th Duke of Bolton. In 1792 his father inherited the earldom of Darlington from his father, whereupon Vane became Viscount Barnard.

In 1812 Barnard became Member of Parliament for County Durham, a seat he held until 1815. He was then MP for Winchelsea from 1816 to 1818, Tregony from 1818 to 1826, Totnes from 1826 to 1830, Saltash from 1830 to 1831 and finally for South Shropshire from 1832 to 1842. In 1827, Barnard's father was promoted in the Peerage as Marquess of Cleveland in 1827 and further as Duke of Cleveland in 1833, whereupon Barnard became Earl of Darlington after the first promotion.

In 1815 Darlington had joined the British Army, eventually rising through the ranks as a lieutenant-colonel in the 75th Regiment of Foot in 1824, major-general in 1851, lieutenant-general in 1857 and finally a general in 1863. In 1842, he inherited his father's titles and was also appointed a Knight of the Garter that year.

On 18 November 1809 at St George's, Hanover Square, Cleveland had married Lady Sophia Poulett (1785–1859), the eldest daughter of John Poulett, 4th Earl Poulett. He died childless in 1864 and his titles passed to his brother, William.

Sources
Cokayne et al., The Complete Peerage

External links
 

1788 births
1864 deaths
Dukes of Cleveland
Knights of the Garter
Barnard, Henry Vane, Viscount
UK MPs 1812–1818
UK MPs 1818–1820
UK MPs 1820–1826
UK MPs 1826–1830
UK MPs 1830–1831
UK MPs 1832–1835
UK MPs 1835–1837
UK MPs 1837–1841
UK MPs 1841–1847
Cleveland, D2
Gordon Highlanders officers
British Army generals
Henry
Barons Barnard
Surtees Society